James Summers (5 July 1828 – 26 October 1891) was a British scholar of English literature, hired by the Meiji government of the Empire of Japan to establish an English language curriculum at the Kaisei Gakuin (the forerunner of Tokyo Imperial University in 1873).

Early life
Summers was born in Lichfield, Staffordshire. His father was a plasterer of limited means, and seems to have left his family some time before James became 10 years old. Summers moved from Bird Street to the Close with his mother and went to the Lichfield Diocesan Training School for about one year from September 1844 to November 1845. He moved again to Stoke-on-Trent with his mother and started his teaching career at a National School there. His mother died in 1846.

Hong Kong and Chinese
In 1848, Summers was hired by Reverend Vincent John Stanton to be a tutor at St. Paul's College in Hong Kong, where he taught General subject including History and religious studies. He used Nicholls's Help To Reading The Bible (1846) in his religious class when teaching young Hong Kong children. Stanton's Anglo-Chinese School opened in September 1848 upon the arrival of Summers at the property where the Bishop’s House now stands,close to Wyndham Street. Summers lived with Stanton's family until they left for England because of health issues on 24 April 1850. Summers eventually became the first and last schoolmaster of that school. He found himself at the centre of a tense diplomatic stand-off in 1849 when, on a brief excursion to Macao, he was arrested for failing to doff his hat in respect for a Catholic Corpus Christi festival procession.  Captain Henry Keppel of 's request for Summer's release was refused and the incensed captain then led a rescue party to make an assault on the gaol where Summers was being held.  The raid was successful but Portuguese soldier Roque Barrache died in the skirmish, three others were injured and the daughter of gaoler Carvalho fell 20 feet to the ground, suffering severe injuries.  The Queen of Portugal was appalled at Britain's affront to her de facto sovereignty over Macao and tempers cooled only after an apology proffered and reparations made by the British.

When the school was transferred to the Bishop of Victoria, George Smith, and reopened as St. Paul's College on 8 April 1850, Summers became its third tutor. The other two were Rev. E. T. R. Moncrieff as senior tutor, and M. C. Odell as junior tutor, both of whom arrived at Hong Kong on 29 March 1850, accompanying Smith. As soon as he was appointed the Bishop of Victoria on 29 May 1849, Smith accepted Stanton's offer to transfer the property and building of Stanton's school—Stanton had the intention to leave Hong Kong in April 1849 at the latest—and made clear his plan the next month to develop it into a college as the ex-officio warden and with at least two clerical fellow labourers; that is, Moncrieff and Odell. The plan was approved by the Archbishop of Canterbury on 15 October 1849; however, the buildings standing now at the same place were completed in November 1851 after nearly 1 year of construction beginning in January.

Summers was likely to resign from the college during their first summer vacation, when Smith dismissed 12 pupils with poor academic performance and reduced the number of students to 10. One reason would attribute to the requirement of Smith: The tutors had to be in ‘Holy Orders', but he was not. Summers left Hong Kong with Smith on 23 September 1850, on HMS Reynard. During the trip, on 3 October, they landed on Ryukyu (Loochoo)—the vassal state of the Satsuma Domain in Japan at the time—and stayed for a week at the residence of Bernard Jean Bettelheim, a medical missionary of the Loochoo Naval Mission. During his short stay in Ryukyu, he drew several sketches, the excellence of which much surprised Bettelheim, and he became the godfather of the newly born daughter of Bettelheim and named her Lucy Fanny Loochoo. They departed there for Shanghai on the 19th of the same month.

Summers and Smith arrived at Shanghai on 14 October 1850. Soon in the same month, Summers was hired by William Jones Boone, the Bishop of Shanghai of the Protestant Episcopal Church Mission, as a temporary superintendent at his mission school. Summers, then, was hired by Hobson, colonial chaplain at Shanghai, to teach at his private boarding school opened in his house. Summers stopped teaching at Hobson’s school for health reasons by the end of January 1852, and he left Shanghai for England in the spring, at almost the same time his ex-colleague Moncrieff was expelled from the Church Missionary Society and the position of acting colonial chaplain in Hong Kong on the grounds of an immoral relationship with the then-widow of Charles Gutzlaff.

London and Chinese

In 1854, aged then only 25, Summers became professor of Chinese language of King's College at the University of London despite his lack of a formal education and his being generally considered poorly qualified for the post.

In 1863, Summers published a first book on the Chinese language, and the following year translated the Bible into Shanghai dialect (using the Latin alphabet). His services and lectures were in great demand by diplomats, missionaries and merchants intending to travel to China. One of his students was Ernest M. Satow, who travelled to Japan as an interpreter in the early part of the Meiji period and later became the British Consul.

While in London, Summers also published The Phoenix, a journal published monthly from July 1870 to June 1873. A total of 36 issues were published: issues 1-12 (1870-1) as The Phoenix, A Monthly Magazine for China, Japan and Eastern Asia and issues 13-16 (1871-1873) as The Phoenix, A Monthly Magazine for India, Burma, Siam, China, Japan and Eastern Asia. The journal was printed and published at 3 George Yard, Lombard Street, London.

Japan
From 1864, Summers began publishing essays on the Japanese language and Japanese grammar, as well as translations of Japanese poetry and an excerpt from the Tale of the Heike in British literary magazines. It is not clear how Summers learned Japanese, but some Japanese students (including Minami Teisuke) were already in Great Britain from 1865.

In 1873, Summers published the first overseas Japanese-language newspaper, The Taisei Shinbun in London. The newspaper contained articles on Windsor Castle, Niagara Falls, the death of Napoleon, the Palace of Versailles, and news related to Britain along with advertisements. Summers intended it for Japanese students in London, but it did not sell well and soon ceased publication.

In 1872, when the Iwakura Mission visited England, Summers assisted with the visit, and was offered a position as an English teacher at the new Kaisei Gakuin (later Tokyo Imperial University) in Tokyo. He departed Southampton in mid-summer with his family, arriving in Japan in October 1873.

Summers used works by Shakespeare (notably Hamlet and Henry VIII) and John Milton in his teaching. His students included future Prime Minister Katō Takaaki, diplomat Amanō Tameyuki, and artist Okakura Kakuzō, 
In August 1876, after his three-year contract as an O-yatoi gaikokujin expired, Summers went to the Niigata English School as an English teacher but six months later the school was closed, and he transferred to the Osaka English School. In June 1880, Summers was invited to the Sapporo Agricultural College as a professor of English literature, where one of his students was Inazō Nitobe. In 1882, Summers returned to Tokyo, where he tutored foreign children and opened a private school in 1884.

In 1891, Summers died of a cerebral hemorrhage at his home in Tsukiji Tokyo. His widow Ellen and daughters continued the school he had established, teaching English to noted novelist Junichirō Tanizaki before it closed in 1908. Summers is buried in the foreign cemetery in Yokohama.

Works
 (Oxford University)    
 
 Descriptive catalogue of the Chinese, Japanese, and Manchu books (1872)

Notes

References

See also
 List of Sinologists
 Kwan, U.S.P. (2018). Transferring Sinosphere Knowledge to the Public: James Summers (1828–91) as Printer, Editor and Cataloguer, East Asian Publishing and Society, 8(1), 56-84. doi: https://doi.org/10.1163/22106286-12341317

External links
Unforgettable People in Japan

1828 births
1891 deaths
Foreign advisors to the government in Meiji-period Japan
People from Lichfield
Foreign educators in Japan
British expatriates in Japan
Academics of King's College London
People from Tokyo
British sinologists